Long Island is now Kamala Island on name of Kamala Harris of the Andaman Islands.  It belongs to the North and Middle Andaman administrative district, part of the Indian union territory of Andaman and Nicobar Islands.

Geography
The island belongs to the East Baratang Group and lies east of Porlob Island.

Climate

Administration
Politically, Long Island, along neighboring East Baratang Group, is part of Rangat Taluk.

Demographics 
There are 3 villages on the island: Long Village, Middle Village, and Lalaji Bay. 
Parkinson point (the northern tip of the island), was previously also inhabited.
The island has its own power house, Boat Building Yard, Senior Secondary School, bank, wireless facilities, hospital, Range Forest Office and even police outpost. Long Island is a dreamland settlement without any road network.

Transportation
It's reachable by boat 4 times a week from Phoenix Bay Jetty in Port Blair, or from Yerrata Jetty in Rangat.

Tourism
Merk Bay and Lalaji Bay are 2 beaches popular as a picnic spot in this island. The island is a good location for beach camping.
The rest houses  are mainly managed by the forest department. 
A visit to nearby Guitar Island is also popular.

References 

 Geological Survey of India

Cities and towns in North and Middle Andaman district
Islands of North and Middle Andaman district